The 1962–63 Illinois Fighting Illini men's basketball team represented the University of Illiniois.

Regular season
The 1962-63 season saw the Fighting Illini finish with 20-6 overall, 11-3 in the conference. Senior Dave Downey led the team in scoring, as he had the previous two seasons, and he moved into first on the all-time scoring list. Downey also set the school record for points in a game, which still stands, with 53 in a road loss to Indiana on February 16, 1963.  Illinois was a game back of first place in the league standings with only two games remaining when the Assembly Hall opened its doors on March 4, 1963. Illinois’ first game at the Hall was an exciting 79-73 victory over Northwestern before 16,137 fans to stay within a game of first-place Ohio State. After Illinois edged Iowa, 73-69, in the last game of the season, the Fighting Illini would need an overtime loss two hours later by the Buckeyes at Indiana to share the title.  During the season the Illini would win the Eastern College Athletic Conference Holiday Festival and make the Elite Eight of the 1963 NCAA Men's Division I Basketball Tournament, losing to eventual champion Loyola (Chicago).

Roster

Source

Schedule
												
Source																
												

|-
!colspan=12 style="background:#DF4E38; color:white;"| Non-Conference regular season
|- align="center" bgcolor=""
											

|-
!colspan=9 style="background:#DF4E38; color:#FFFFFF;"|Big Ten regular season

|-
!colspan=9 style="text-align: center; background:#DF4E38"|NCAA Tournament

|-

Rankings

Player stats

Awards and honors
 Dave Downey
Helms 1st team All-American
Converse 2nd team All-American
Associated Press Honorable Mention All-American
Team Most Valuable Player
Fighting Illini All-Century team (2005)
Bill Small
Converse Honorable Mention All-American
Skip Thoren
Fighting Illini All-Century team (2005)

Team players drafted into the NBA

References

Illinois Fighting Illini
Illinois Fighting Illini men's basketball seasons
1962 in sports in Illinois
1963 in sports in Illinois